Alphonse Crespo (aka Luis Crespo) is a Swiss orthopedic surgeon. Founder in 2007 of Medicine & Liberty  a medical network dedicated to the study and advocacy of liberty, ethics & market in medical services. President of the Cercle de philosophie politique Benjamin Constant  at the Institut Libéral  a Swiss free-market think tank. Author of Esculape Foudroyé, ed. Les Belles Lettres Paris 1991  and of numerous essays and articles such as Medicine: Deregulated or Dead , Black Market Medicine an Ethical alternative to State Control  , Outlawing Medicine  or The End of Welfare and its effect on the Poor. From Adam Smith to Karl Marx... and back  Une sieste à La Havane & autres récits obituaires" (fiction). Amazon books  of "La désobéissance civile" (2012) in "Libres" . Le serment d'Hippocrate et l'éthique de la liberté in "Au chevet du système de santé", ed. Institut Liberal 2013..
His writings advocate a libertarian approach to medical ethics and a full return of medicine to the free market.

References

Sources
 FMH - Swiss Federation of Doctors 
 Medicine & Liberty, 
 Amazon books,

Swiss orthopedic surgeons
Swiss libertarians
Living people
Year of birth missing (living people)